Katrin Peterhans (born 28 March 1962) is a former Swiss female curler.

She competed at the 1988 Winter Olympics when curling was a demonstration sport.

Teams

References

External links
 

Living people
1962 births
Swiss female curlers
European curling champions
Swiss curling champions
Curlers at the 1988 Winter Olympics
Olympic curlers of Switzerland
20th-century Swiss women